George Allan Fischoff (August 3, 1938 – February 20, 2018) was an American pianist and composer. He is best known as the writer or co-writer of many hit songs, including "Lazy Day", "98.6", "Run to My Lovin' Arms", "Ain't Gonna Lie", and "Georgia Porcupine", and as the composer for the Broadway musical Georgy.

References

External links
https://music.metason.net/artistinfo?name=George+Fischoff&born=

1938 births
2018 deaths
People from Indiana
American male songwriters
Songwriters from Indiana